The  is a style of polyphonic folk singing characteristic of the island of Sardinia (Italy's second largest island), particularly the region of Barbagia, though some other Sardinian sub-regions bear examples of such tradition.

Etymology

In the Barbagia region on the island of Sardinia, there are two different styles of polyphonic singing:

Technique

 is traditionally practised by groups of four male singers standing in a close circle. Each singer has a distinct role, here listed in descending pitch order—form a chorus (another meaning of ):
  is the 'counter'
  as 'bass'

The  sings a poetic text in Sardinian, which can be of epic, historic, satirical, amorous or even protest genre. The chorus consists of nonsense syllables (for example bim-bam-boo).

According to popular tradition,  imitates the sound of wind, while the  imitates a sheep bleating and the  a cow lowing.

The solo voice starts a monodic vocal line and is then joined by the others as he indicates to them to join in. 

The effect is somewhat that of a round except that the points where the other singers join in vary and, thus, the harmonies vary from version to version.

Tradition

According to some anthropologists,  was performed back in Nuragic times.

Notes

References

Listening
Tenore singers on a mountain

See also 

 Throat singing

External links

The Oral Tradition of the a Tenore Song, an expression of Intangible heritage of the Sardinian pastoral culture
Sardinian Music - Buy Sardinian Music
Tenores.org

Italian folk music
Music in Sardinia
Masterpieces of the Oral and Intangible Heritage of Humanity
A cappella
Four-part harmony